Joel Besekezi Ssenyonyi is a Ugandan journalist and politician. He is the member of parliament for the Nakawa West constituency in Kampala. He also serves as the Spokesperson of the National Unity Platform NUP.

Politics 
Ssenyonyi was elected as the NUP parliamentary candidate for the Nakawa West seat in the 2021 Ugandan general election. He won the seat after defeating the National Resistance Movement's Margret Zziwa Nantongo.

Personal Life 
Joel Ssenyonyi is married to Febress Nagawa. The couple wedded in 2020.

References 

Living people
Ugandan journalists
Members of the Parliament of Uganda
Year of birth missing (living people)
21st-century Ugandan politicians
National Unity Platform politicians